Mān San is the name of two settlements in Shan State, Burma.

One is located at 
One is located at

References

See also
Mansan (disambiguation)
Mānsān

Populated places in Shan State